The High Sheriff of Antrim is the Sovereign's judicial representative in County Antrim. Initially an office for lifetime, assigned by the Sovereign, the high sheriff became annually appointed from the Provisions of Oxford in 1258. Besides his judicial importance, he has ceremonial and administrative functions and executes High Court Writs.

History
The first (High) Shrivalties were established before the Norman Conquest in 1066 and date back to Saxon times. In 1908, an Order in Council made the Lord-Lieutenant the Sovereign's prime representative in a county and reduced the High Sheriff's precedence. Despite however that the office retains his responsibilities for the preservation of law and order in a county.

While the office of High Sheriff ceased to exist in those Irish counties, which had formed the Irish Free State in 1922, it is still present in the counties of Northern Ireland.

Medieval 
1326: John  Athy

James I, 1603–1625

1603: Thomas Pavell
1613: Hugh Clotworthy
1618: Sir Hugh Clotworthy
1622: Sir Hugh Clotworthy

Charles I, 1625–1649

1625: Moses Hill
1626: Neal Oge O'Neill
1627: Cormick O'Hara
1628: William Houston
1629: Alexander MacDonnell
1630: Robert Adair
1631: Arthur O'Neill
1632: Alexander Stuart
1633: John Donaldson
1634: Arthur Hill
1635: Edward Maxwell
1636: John Dalway

English Interregnum, 1649–1660

1656: Roger Lyndon
1659: John Upton

Charles II, 1660–1685

1660: John Shaw
1661: Hercules Langford
1662: Alexander Dalway
1663: Thomas Warrin
1664: Richard Dobbs
1665: John Donaldson
1666: Anthony Horsman
1667: Francis Stafford
1668: Patrick Agnew
1669: Archibald Edmonston
1670: Sir Robert Colville
1671: George Maccartney
1672: William Upton

1673: Thadeus O'Hara
1674: John Galland
1675: Randall Bryce
1676: William Huston
1677: William Lesley
1678: Edward Harrison
1679: Henry Spencer
1680: Randall Smith
1681: George Macartney
1682: John Bickerstaffe
1683: John Bickerstaffe † / succeeded by Charles Stuart
1684: Henry Davys

James II, 1685–1688

1685: Thomas Knox
1686: Cormick O'Neill

1687: Cormick O'Neill
1688: Shane O'Neill

William III, 1689–1702

1689: Shane O'Neill
1690: Isaac MacCartney
1691: Thomas Smith
1692: Thomas Smith
1693: William Shaw
1694: Richard Dobbs
1695: Clotworthy Upton

1696: Sir Robert Adair
1697: Michael Harrison
1698: Edmond Ellis
1699: Andrew Clements
1700: John O'Neill
1701: John Davys

Anne, 1702–1714

1702: Benjamin Galland
1703: Charles O'Neill
1704: Brent Spencer
1705: John Davys
1706: Westerna Warring
1707: Edward Clements

1708: Benjamin Galland
1709: Arthur Davys
1710: William Shaw
1711: Andrew Clements
1712: Westerna Warring
1713: Brent Spencer

George I, 1714–1727

1714: Robert Green
1715: Edmund T. Stafford
1716: Edward Clements
1717: James Hamilton
1718: William Moore
1719: Hercules Upton
1720: Arthur Dobbs

1721: Francis Clements
1722: Henry O'Hara
1723: William Johnston
1724: Ezekiel William Crombie
1725: Ezekiel Davys Wiilson
1726: Sir Robert Adair

George II, 1727–1760

1727: Rowley Hill
1728: John Skeffington
1729: Charles O'Neill
1730: Valentine Jones
1731: Alexander Stuart
1732: John Moore
1733: Hector McNeill
1734: Hugh Boyd
1735: John Houston
1736: Clotworthy O'Neill
1737: Hill Wilson
1738: Edward Smith
1739: Davys Wilson
1740: William Boyd
1741: Conway Spencer
1742: Felix O'Neill
1743: George Macartney

1744: William Agnew
1745: Charles MacDaniel
1746: John Cuppage
1747: Edmund MacNaghten
1748: Edward Brice
1749: Roger MacNeill
1750: Roger Moore
1751: John Dunkin
1752: Conway Richard Dobbs
1753: Robert Adair
1754: Bernard O'Neill
1755: John Rowan
1756: John MacNaghten
1757: Arthur Upton
1758: Charles O'Hara
1759: James Leslie

George III, 1760–1820

1760: Richard Magenis
1761: Alexander Boyd
1762: Alexander Stuart
1763: John Henry
1764: Rowley Heylands
1765: Charles Hamilton
1766: Alexander MacAuley
1767: Sampson Moore
1768: Thomas Thomson
1769: Bryan MacManus
1770: Alexander Legge
1771: Randal William MacDonnell, Viscount Dunluce
1772: John O'Neill
1773: Hugh Boyd
1774: St John O'Neill
1775: Robert Morris Jones † / succeeded by Samuel Bristow
1776: Ezekiel Davies Boyd
1777: William Dunkin
1778: William Moore
1779: Robert Rowan
1780: William Legge
1781: Bartholomew MacNaghten
1782: Alexander MacManus
1783: John Brown
1784: John Crombie
1785: Henry O'Hara
1786: John Allen
1787: Robert Gage
1788: Henry W. Shaw
1789: Charles Crymble

1790: Samuel Allen
1791: Richard Gervais Kerr
1792: Hugh Boyd
1793: Edmund Alexander Macnaghten
1794: Roger Moore
1795: Stewart Banks
1796: James Watson
1797: Hon. Chichester Skeffington
1798: James Stewart Moore
1799: James Leslie
1800: George A. MacCleverty
1801: Thomas Benjamin Adair
1802: Langford Heylands
1803: Edward Jones-Agnew
1804: Hugh Montgomery
1805: Sir Henry Vane-Tempest, 2nd Bt
1806: Hon. John Bruce O'Neill
1807: Francis MacNaghten
1808: William Moore
1809: Stephen Moore
1810: Ezekiel Boyd
1811: James Caulfield
1812: John Campbell
1813: George Bristow
1814: John Rowan
1815: James Agnew Farrell
1816: Robert Thompson
1817: Samuel Thompson
1818: Hon. Thomas Henry Skeffington
1819: John Montgomery

George IV, 1820–1830

1820: Edmund MacDonald
1821: John Cromie
1822: Hon. Hercules Robert Pakenham
1823: William Wallace Legge
1824: Francis Turnley

1825: George Hutchinson of Ballymoney
1826: Alexander MacManus
1827: John MacCance
1828: Cunningham Gregg
1829: Nicholas de la Cherois-Crommelin

William IV, 1830–1837

1830: Richard Magennis
1831: George H. Macartney
1832: Alexander McNeill
1833: Charles O'Hara

1834: David Kerr
1835: Hugh Leckey of Beardiville
1836: Edward Bruce of Scoutbush

Victoria, 1837–1901

1837: Edmund C. MacNaghten
1838: James Owens
1839: James Agnew
1840: T. Gregg
1841: Conway Richard Dobbs
1842: Alexander Henry Haliday
1843: John MacNeill
1844: John MacGildowney
1845: John White
1846: Thomas Morres Hamilton Jones of Moneyglass House
1847: William Moore
1848: Charles MacGarel
1849: James Stewart Moore
1850: Alexander Montgomery
1851: James Thomson Tennant
1852: Robert Smyth
1853: Robert Alexander Shafto Adair, 1st Baron Waveney
1854: James Edmund Leslie
1855: Ambrose O'Rorke
1856: Robert Grimshaw
1857: David Stewart Ker of Montalto
1858: Andrew Mulholland of Springvale, Ballywalter
1859: George Gray
1860: Henry Hugh McNeile
1861: Henry H. H. O'Hara
1862: Frederick Hugh Henry
1863: John Young
1864:
1865:
1866: William Thomas Bristow Lyons
1867: Robert James Montgomery
1868: Richard Henry Magenis

1869: William Coates
1870: Robert James Montgomery
1871: Henry Adair
1872:
1873: James Chaine
1874: Thomas Casement
1875: Robert Jackson Alexander
1876: Sir Charles Lanyon
1877: Sir Francis Edmund Workman-Macnaghten, 3rd Bt
1878: James Owens
1879: Edmund McNeill
1880: James Stewart-Moore
1881: John Casement
1882:
1883: Ogilvie Blair Graham
1884: Anthony Traill
1885: Thomas Montgomery
1886: Samuel Allen
1887: Henry Cole Magenis
1888: Montagu William Edward Dobbs
1889: James Sinclair Cramsie
1890: William Moore
1891: James Macaulay
1892: George Edmondstone Kirk
1893: Victor Coates of Rathmore, Dunmurry
1894:
1895: Harold William Stannus Gray
1896:
1897: Sir William Quartus Ewart, 2nd Bt
1898: William James Pirrie
1899: Hugh Houston Smiley
1900: George Johnston Preston

Edward VII, 1901–1910

1901: Robert Henry Sturrock Reade
1902: William Chaine
1903: Thomas Hugh Torrens
1904: William Henry Holmes Lyons
1905: John Milne Barbour

1906: Hercules Arthur Pakenham
1907: James Graham Leslie
1908: Sir William Grey Ellison-Macartney
1909: Archibald Edward Dobbs
1910: John Alexander Montgomery

George V, 1910–1936

1911: Robert Peel Dawson Spencer Chichester
1912: Sir Thomas James Dixon, 2nd Bt
1913: Edward Johnson Charley
1914:
1915:
1916: Sir William Thompson Adair
1917: John Johnston Kirkpatrick
1918:
1919:
1920:
1921: Arthur Frederick Dobbs
1922: Charles Lewis MacKean
1923: Sir Francis Alexander Macnaghten, 8th Bt

1924: Thomas Kelly Evans Johnston
1925: James Love McFerran
1926: James Young
1927: Robert Arthur Alexander
1928: St Clair Mulholland Dobbs
1929: William Stewart Traill
1930: Hugh Lecky
1931: Sir William Frederick Coates, 1st Bt
1932: Sydney James Lyle
1933: Arthur O'Neill Cubitt Chichester
1934: Sir Robert William Hugh O'Neill, 1st Bt
1935: Godfrey William Ferguson
1936: John Alexander James Montgomery

George VI, 1936–1952

1937: James Stewart Moore
1938: Robert Christopher Alexander
1939: Anthony O'Brien Traill
1940: Sir George Ernest Clark, 2nd Bt
1941: David Cecil Lindsay
1942: John Dermot Campbell
1943: Sydney Adam McNeill
1944: William Samson Moore

1945: William Litton Rowland De Burgh Young
1946: Arthur Cochran Herdman
1947: Henry Adair Allen
1948: Edward Stanley Clarke
1949: Archibald Gordon Edward Turnley
1950: Alexander James Henry Cramsie of O'harabrook, Ballymoney
1951: Francis Casement

Elizabeth II, 1952–2022

1952: Hugh Cameron McGildowney
1953: Hon. Terence Marne O'Neill
1954: Sir George Anthony Clark, 3rd Bt
1955: Samuel Gillmor Haughton
1956: Robert Henry Reade
1957: George Burrell MacKean
1958: Hon. Phelim Robert Hugh O'Neill
1959: Ralph Pethebridge Martin
1960: John William Frazer
1961: Martin Edward Harcourt Mulholland
1962: Redmond Rochfort Young
1963: John Young
1964: William Roger Clothworthy Moore
1965: Robert Simpson Hanson
1966: Sir Antony MacNaghten, 10th Bt
1967: James Francis Leslie
1968: John O'Neill McClintock
1969: Sir Robert George Caldwell Kinahan
1970: Hugh James Montgomery
1971: Charles Henry Grierson Kinahan
1972: Anthony Kenneth Frazer
1973: Victor Alexander Cooke
1974: Arthur Henry Bates
1975: Frank Bryan Savage Maclaran
1976: Sir William Ivan Cecil Ewart, 6th Bt
1977: Josias Cunningham Junior
1978: William Hunter Robert Charley
1979: William Denis Grenville Mackie
1980: Richard Severn Traill
1981: John Michael Ross
1982: William David Boyle Vandeleur
1983: Hon. Thomas Robin Valerian Dixon
1984: J. P. Cooke
1985: P. C. D. Campbell
1986:

1987:
1988:
1989: Sandy Cramsie
1990:
1991: M. D. Stewart-Moore
1992: Richard G. Reade
1993: P. D. Cooke
1994: Andrew David Frazer
1995: John H. H. Stewart
1996: Daniel de Burgh Kinahan
1997: Richard Francis Andrew Dobbs
1998: Ronald Conway
1999: Pamela Traill
2000: Patricia Elise MacCarthy-Morrogh
2001: John Weir Wallace
2002: Hon. Michael John Alexander Cooke
2003: Hugh Edward John Montgomery
2004: Sheelagh Elizabeth Hillan
2005: David John Reade
2006: James Seymour Leslie
2007: Joseph Wilson
2008: Lady Juliet C. Frazer
2009: Nigel Dobbs
2010: Steven Montgomery
2011: David Severn Traill of Bushmills
2012: Julia Elizabeth Shirley of Larne
2013: Mervyn G Rankin of Portglenone
2014: Hon. Shane O'Neill of Antrim
2015: John Pinkerton of Ballymoney
2016: James Ernest Perry of Ballymena
2017: Miranda Tisdale, DL of Muckamore
2018: Gillian May Bingham of Ballyclare
2019: James Ronald Hassard of Ballyclare
2020: Rupert Cramsie of Ballymoney
2021: Susan Jane Pinkerton of Ballymoney
2022: John Anthony Lockett, OBE of Lisburn

Charles III, 2022–present

See also
The Antrim Lieutenancy Website

Notes
† Died in office

References

 
Antrim
History of County Antrim